The 1979 National Revenue Tennis Classic, also known as the Buckeye Championships, was a men's tennis tournament played on outdoor clay courts at the Muirfield Village in Dublin, a suburb of Columbus, Ohio in the United States that was part of the 1979 Grand Prix circuit. It was the tenth edition of the tournament and was held  from August 6 through August 12, 1979. Second-seeded Brian Gottfried won the singles title.

Finals

Singles
 Brian Gottfried defeated  Eddie Dibbs 6–3, 6–0
 It was Gottfried's 1st singles title of the year and 16th of his career.

Doubles
 Brian Gottfried /  Bob Lutz defeated  Tim Gullikson /  Tom Gullikson 4–6, 6–3, 7–6(7–1)

References

External links
 ITF tournament edition details

Buckeye Tennis Championships
Buckeye Tennis Championships
Buckeye Tennis Championships
Buckeye Tennis Championships